Dystasia is a genus of longhorn beetles of the subfamily Lamiinae, containing the following species:

 Dystasia affinis Gahan, 1906
 Dystasia bella (Breuning, 1940)
 Dystasia chassoti Breuning, 1973
 Dystasia circulata Pascoe, 1864
 Dystasia cristata Fisher, 1933
 Dystasia grisescens Breuning, 1954
 Dystasia humeralis Breuning, 1958
 Dystasia javanica Breuning, 1938
 Dystasia laterivitta (Breuning, 1942)
 Dystasia multifasciculata Breuning, 1943
 Dystasia niasensis Breuning, 1943
 Dystasia nubila Pascoe, 1886
 Dystasia proxima Breuning, 1938
 Dystasia pygmaeola (Breuning, 1938)
 Dystasia quadratiplagiata (Breuning, 1938)
 Dystasia semicana Pascoe, 1864
 Dystasia siamensis Breuning, 1938
 Dystasia sibuyana (Aurivillius, 1927)
 Dystasia similis Gahan, 1907
 Dystasia siporensis Breuning, 1939
 Dystasia subcristata Breuning, 1938
 Dystasia subuniformis Breuning, 1938
 Dystasia tonkinea (Pic, 1930)
 Dystasia valida Breuning, 1937
 Dystasia variegata Fisher, 1936

References

Pteropliini